Shohaday-e Haftom-e-Tir Indoor Stadium is one of the oldest indoor arenas in Tehran which has been built in 1957. This arena is located on Fayyazbakhsh street. It is mostly used for Wrestling competitions.

The 2014 FILA Wrestling World Cup - Men's Greco-Roman was held at this Sports Hall.

References 

Indoor arenas in Iran
Sports venues in Tehran
Wrestling venues
Sports venues completed in 1957
1957 establishments in Iran